Levan Kirakosyan (born 24 December 1973) is an Armenian former professional boxer who competed from 1999 to 2012. He twice held the European super featherweight title between 2007 and 2010.

Professional career
In 2005, Levan Kirakosyan was the World Boxing Foundation (WBFo) World Champion.

On 3 March 2007, he defeated Antonio João Bento to capture the vacant European super featherweight title. He defended, lost, regained, and again lost that title.

References

External links 
 

Living people
1973 births
Armenian male boxers
Super-featherweight boxers
European Boxing Union champions
French people of Armenian descent
Sportspeople from Gyumri